Dirofilaria is a filarial (arthropod-borne) nematode (roundworm), in the family Onchocercidae. Some species cause dirofilariasis, a state of parasitic infection, in humans and other animals.

There are about 27 species in the genus. These are generally divided into two subgenera, Dirofilaria and Nochtiella.

Some species are well-known parasites, including Dirofilaria immitis, the dog heartworm, Dirofilaria repens, which affects many types of nonhuman mammals, and Dirofilaria tenuis, which usually parasitizes raccoons, but can infect humans, as well.

Human dirofilariasis is generally caused by D. immitis and D. repens.  The former can cause pulmonary dirofilariasis, which may have no symptoms.  Another form of the infection can be characterized by a painful lump under the skin or infection of the eye.  The nematodes are spread by mosquitoes.

Etymology
From Latin dīrus 'fearful; ominous' + fīlum 'thread', Dirofilaria is a genus of nematodes of the superfamily Filarioidea. The first known description of Dirofilaria may have been by Italian nobleman Francesco Birago in 1626 in his Treatise on Hunting: “The dog generates two worms, which are half an arm’s length long and thicker than a finger and red like fire.” Birago erroneously identified the worms as a larval stage of another parasite, Dioctophyme renale. The dog heartworm was named Filaria by American parasitologist Joseph Leidy in 1856, and the genus was renamed Dirofilaria by French parasitologists Railliet and Henry in 1911.

Taxonomy
Species in the genus include: 
Dirofilaria acutiuscula
Dirofilaria aethiops
Dirofilaria ailure
Dirofilaria asymmetrica
Dirofilaria cancrivori
Dirofilaria conjunctivae
Dirofilaria corynodes
Dirofilaria desportesi
Dirofilaria fausti
Dirofilaria freitasi
Dirofilaria genettae
Dirofilaria hystrix
Dirofilaria immitis – dog heartworm
Dirofilaria indica
Dirofilaria louisianensis
Dirofilaria macacae
Dirofilaria macrodemos
Dirofilaria magalhaesi
Dirofilaria magnilarvata
Dirofilaria pongoi
Dirofilaria reconditum
Dirofilaria repens
Dirofilaria roemeri 
Dirofilaria tawila
Dirofilaria tenuis
Dirofilaria timidi
Dirofilaria uniformis
Dirofilaria ursi

References
This article uses public domain text from the CDC as cited

Spirurida
Secernentea genera